Edwin Deakin (May 21, 1838 – May 11, 1923) was a British-American artist best known for his romantic landscapes as well as his architectural studies, especially the Spanish colonial missions of California. His still lifes are considered to be some of the finest of the genre. Deakin is one of the artists who popularized scenes of San Francisco's Chinatown. His sensitive and highly publicized depictions of the deteriorating missions drew public attention to the necessity of restoring these historically important monuments.

Life

Deakin was born in Sheffield, England, on May 21, 1838.  He was apprenticed at the age of 12 to a business which painted landscapes and floral designs on furniture in the "Japanese style," but he received no formal training.  By 18, he was a notable landscape artist. He emigrated to the US in 1856 with his family to the city of Chicago, where his father opened a hardware store and Edwin's occupation was listed in the Census as a "case maker."  On June 21, 1865 Edwin Deakin married the 21-year-old Isabel Fox, also an emigrant from England. The following year saw the birth of their son Oscar Edwin Deakin, who became a talented painter, but died at the age of 30. The Deakins also had a daughter, Edna, who became an architect.

San Francisco
Just prior to 1870 Edwin, along with his entire extended family, moved to San Francisco, California.  He quickly established a successful career as a painter of the untamed California wilderness. Although he consigned his paintings to private commercial galleries and was a director and frequent exhibitor at the San Francisco Art Association (SFAA), he sold most of his canvases through public auctions. He became an exhibiting member of the Graphic Club and Bohemian Club. In 1874 he exhibited a Lake Tahoe scene at the Chicago Academy of Arts.

Three years later he left on a grand tour of Europe, where he painted primarily in England, France and Switzerland, and exhibited at the Paris Salon.  He returned in May 1879 to San Francisco. The first showings of his new European paintings in San Francisco garnered much attention. He exhibited dozens of paintings to positive reviews at the California State Fair between 1879 and 1889.  He traveled extensively through the Midwest and had prolonged stays in both Denver (1882–83) and Salt Lake City (1883). Deakin's highly publicized disputes with the "rebels" of the San Francisco art colony caused him to withdraw in 1885 as an exhibiting member of the SFAA. At this time his still lifes of pendulous grapes became extremely popular and were much imitated. During one of his several trips to New York City he published a series of articles which called for the standardization of canvas sizes, a common practice in Europe that allowed for the mass production of cheaper frames.

Berkeley
In 1891, Deakin moved with his wife and two daughters to the university town of Berkeley, just across the bay from San Francisco, where he built a large residence and studio-gallery. He soon began a tradition of holding an annual studio exhibit open to the public.  Deakin still maintained a small sales office in San Francisco and continued to contribute his paintings to that city's auctions and private galleries. His one-man show in April 1900 at the Palace Hotel featured all of his 21 California Spanish mission paintings, many in elaborate iconographic frames designed by the artist himself.  His campaign to save the missions was the subject of a highly laudatory article in the Washington, D.C. Herald.

Deakin exhibited frequently at public venues in Oakland as well as in Berkeley where he actively supported the creation of the Berkeley Art Association in 1907. He helped to design and decorate his brother's Studio Building in Berkeley, which became the first home for the California School of Arts and Crafts (today's California College of the Arts) and the professional address of many prominent artists, including Henry Joseph Breuer and Evelyn Withrow. His many depictions of the 1906 San Francisco earthquake and fire received great attention. He expanded his Berkeley gallery to maintain a permanent display of one of the three sets of his mission paintings and allowed the public to visit three days a week.

He was a British citizen at the time of his death on May 11, 1923.

Publications
1966 saw the publication of A Gallery of California Mission Paintings by Edwin Deakin, edited by Ruth I. Mahood and produced by the staff of the History Division, Los Angeles County Museum of Natural History (W. Ritchie Press).

The monograph Edwin Deakin: California Painter of the Picturesque by Scott A. Shields (Petaluma, CA: Pomegranate) was published in 2008 to coincide with a Deakin exhibit at the Crocker Art Museum in Sacramento.

Gallery

Works from the Crocker Art Museum, Sacramento

Works from the Oakland Museum of California

Works from the De Young Museum, San Francisco

Elsewhere

References

External links
 Art Restoration of Paintings of Old Spanish Missions of California by Edwin Deakin in the Santa Barbara Mission Archive and Library
 Video, articles, and images of Deakin's paintings of California missions at Sullivan Goss art gallery
 Edwin Deakin page at athenaeum.org includes 85 images of works by the artist

American landscape painters
American romantic painters
English emigrants to the United States
Artists from Sheffield
1838 births
1923 deaths
Artists from the San Francisco Bay Area
19th-century American painters
American male painters
20th-century American painters
19th-century American male artists
20th-century American male artists